L 97-12 (or WD 0752-676, or LHS 34, or Gliese 293) is a nearby degenerate star (white dwarf), located in the constellation Volans, the single known component of the system.

Distance
Possibly, L 97-12 is the ninth-closest white dwarf after Sirius B, Procyon B, van Maanen's star, Gliese 440, 40 Eridani B, Stein 2051 B, GJ 1221 and Gliese 223.2. (However, there is probability, that white dwarfs GJ 1087, Gliese 518 and (with lesser probability) Gliese 915 may be located closer.) Trigonometric parallax of L 97-12 was included in the YPC (Yale Parallax Catalog), and subsequently it was measured more precisely in CTIOPI (Cerro Tololo Inter-American Observatory (CTIO) Parallax Investigation) 0.9 m telescope program:

Physical parameters

L 97-12 has temperature 5,700 ± 90 K, almost like the Sun, and cooling age, i.e. age as degenerate star (not including lifetime as main-sequence star and as giant star) 2.65 ± 0.10 Gyr. It has a white appearance due to similar temperature to Sun.

See also
 List of star systems within 25–30 light-years

Notes

References

Volans (constellation)
White dwarfs
0293
J07530814-6747314